Peter VII may refer to:

 Pope Peter VII of Alexandria (died 1852)
 Patriarch Peter VII of Alexandria (1949–2004)